Qapik Attagutsiak (born 11 June 1920) is the last known surviving contributor to the war effort in Inuit communities during World War II, particularly the drive to collect animal bones and carcasses for the Allied munitions effort.

Early life
Attagutsiak was born in Siuraq, near Igluligaarjuk and Coral Harbour, in the Kivalliq Region of what is now Nunavut, Canada. Her father, Quliktalik, was a hunter, and her mother, Pakak, was a seamstress. She began to learn midwifery from her mother when she was 10 years old, becoming a midwife when she was 18, and subsequently working as a seamstress. She married a man named Attagutsiak, who became one of the first members of the Canadian Rangers in 1947. Qapik had 14 children with her husband Attagutsiak, the first of which was born in 1939, and she adopted two more after her husband's death in 1984.

Wartime efforts
Attagutsiak was 20 years old when news of World War II reached her community in 1940, and she is now the last known surviving member of the Inuit wartime efforts during World War II. During World War II, the Government of Canada and the Department of Munitions and Supply instituted the National Resources Mobilization Act, encouraging citizens to salvage as much waste as possible, with the goal of repurposing used materials like metal, rubber, and paper into wartime munitions. Because these materials were not abundant in the Canadian Arctic, instead Inuit communities began to collect animal bones and carcasses to be shipped down to industrial cities and ports for use in the ongoing munitions drive. One center of the bone and carcass collection efforts was a springtime hunting camp on an island called Qaipsunik, near Igloolik in contemporary Nunavut. The members of the camp collected about three bags of animal bones and carcasses per day from 1940 through 1945, where each bag weighed about 125 pounds. The bags were packaged by older members of the community, and then existing Hudson's Bay Company shipping routes were used to transport the bags to southern Canadian ports in cities like Montreal and Halifax where the materials were processed into ammunition, glue for aircraft, or fertilizer for the Canadian war effort.

Recognition
In 2012, Attagutsiak received the Queen Elizabeth II Diamond Jubilee Medal, which is awarded "to honour significant contributions and achievements by Canadians". In January 2020, a ceremony in Gatineau was organised by Parks Canada and the Canadian Armed Forces at the Canadian Museum of History to honour Attagutsiak's contributions as the only known surviving representative of the wartime efforts by Inuit communities during World War II. Jonathan Wilkinson, the Minister of Environment and Climate Change and Minister responsible for Parks Canada, named her one of Parks Canada's Hometown Heroes.

Attagutsiak has also been acknowledged for her work as a health professional. Parks Canada has credited Attagutsiak with being "instrumental in helping establish the Akausivik Inuit Family Health Team - Medical Centre in Ottawa" in her capacity as a midwife. She has also contributed to academic studies of health promotion, and the use of technology to improve health outcomes, among Inuit living in cities.

Attagutsiak has for several years been the eldest elder in Arctic Bay, and has been called a "revered elder" in Nunatsiaq News. In 2014, a photo by Clare Kines that documented Attagutsiak's traditional lifestyle was a finalist in the Global Arctic Awards International Photography Competition, and was exhibited internationally.

References

1920 births
Living people
Canadian Inuit women
Inuit from Nunavut
Canadian women in World War II
Canadian centenarians
Women centenarians
20th-century Canadian women